Across the globe, Hindus celebrate a diverse number of festivals and celebrations, typically marking events from ancient India and often coinciding with seasonal changes. These celebrations take place either on a fixed annual date on the solar calendar, or on a specific day of the lunisolar calendar. There is some regional variation with the observance of the festivals, and numerous festivals that are primarily celebrated by specific sects or in certain regions of the Indian subcontinent.

Terminology

Dolu Utsava
Utsava is the Sanskrit word for festivals. The Sanskrit word Utsava comes from the word "ut" meaning "starts" and "sava" which means "Change" or "Decline".Dolu Means seasonal colouring. Both solar and lunisolar calendar operates on basis of Dolu Utsava.

Observance periods (tithi)

Hindu calendar dates are usually prescribed according to a lunisolar calendar. In Vedic timekeeping, a māsa is a lunar month, a pakṣa is a lunar fortnight and a tithi is a lunar day.

Two definitions of the lunar month prevail: amānta and pūrṇimānta (lunar month ending with new moon and full moon respectively). As a result, the same day may refer to belonging to different but adjoining months. If a festival occurs during śukla paksha, the two traditions assign it to the same month; if a festival occurs during kṛṣṇa paksha the two traditions assign it to different but adjoining months.

Sublists
List of Hindu festivals in Punjab
List of festivals observed at Jagannatha Temple, Puri
List of Sindhi festivals

List and descriptions of major Hindu festivals
The tithi shown in the following list is as per the amānta tradition.

See also

 Hindu festival related concepts

 Astronomical basis of the Hindu calendar
 Coconut: use for worship
 Culture of India
 Dhupa
 Hindu prayer beads
 Hindu temple
 Incense of India
 Mala
 Ghats
 Mudras
 Namaste
 Pādodaka
 Pranāma
 Parikrama
 The Archaeology of Hindu Ritual
 Yatra

Others
 Buddhist prayer beads
 Guru-shishya tradition
 Jain festivals
 Lists of festivals
 Puja (Buddhism)
List of Hindu Empires and Dynasties

References

External links
Festivals, Ministry of Culture 

Hindu
Festivals
Lists of observances
Lists of religious festivals
Lists of festivals in Pakistan
 
2021 All Festivals | Date, Timing, History